Halophilosciidae is a family of woodlice in the order Isopoda. There are at least 3 genera and more than 30 described species in Halophilosciidae.

Genera
These three genera belong to the family Halophilosciidae:
 Halophiloscia Verhoeff, 1908
 Littorophiloscia Hatch, 1947
 Stenophiloscia Verhoeff, 1908

References

Further reading

 

Woodlice
Crustacean families